The Tainionvirta is a river in the Päijät-Häme region of Finland. It begins at Jääsjärvi, Hartola. At Sysmä the river flows into the Päijänne. There are five rapids, but typically water flows quite slowly. It is possible to paddle the river.

See also
List of rivers of Finland

References

Rivers of Finland
Hartola, Finland